A.O Zevgolateio F.C. is a Greek football club, based in Zevgolateio, Corinthia.

Honors

Domestic Titles and honors
 Corinthia FCA Champions: 1
 2015-16
 Corinthia FCA Cup Winners: 1
 2015-16

Corinthia
Association football clubs established in 1969
1969 establishments in Greece

Gamma Ethniki clubs